Meshullam ben Menahem of Volterra (Hebrew: משולם בן מנחם; d. 1508), also known as Meshullam da Volterra, was an Italian Jewish businessman who traveled to the Land of Israel and surrounding Jewish communities. His works provide concise and important details about the nature and conditions of Ottoman Jewry.

Biography 
Born in the mid 15th century in Volterra, Italy. His father, Menahem ben Aaron was a wealthy and fancier who in 1460 was worth 100,000 ducats. In his early years Meshullam gained notable wealth by trading precious stones, and according to Abraham Portaleone, Meshullam even wrote a book on jewelry. He later took over his father's successful loan-bank in Florence, where he became friendly with Lorenzo de Medici whom he once sent a gift of game. It was during this time that Meshullam began to develop an interest in Jewish literature and philosophy which inspired him to visit the Land of Israel. In spring of 1481 he undertook a journey to Jerusalem, going by way of Rhodes to Alexandria, where he apparently saw a beautiful manuscript of the Hebrew Bible, which the natives claimed had been written by Ezra. In Cairo, where he bought gems, and was greeted by Solomon ben Joseph. On July 29, he reached Jerusalem, where at that time there were only 250 Jewish families. He then passed through Jaffa and Damascus to Crete, where he was shipwrecked, and lost his precious stones. His life was saved by a German Jewish physician and Meshullam finally reached Venice in October. Meshullam wrote in Hebrew an account of his journey called Massa Meshullam mi-Volterra be-Erez Yisrael (מסע משולם מוולטרה בארץ-ישראל) which contains a wealth of information about the cities he visited and their Jewish communities and traditions; he also gives much information of economic interest. While occasionally noting local legends, he is often skeptical about them. He shows also some familiarity with classical literature. His style is readable and attractive although containing some grammatical errors and numerous Italian expressions. Meshullam died in 1507 or 1508 in Venice.

References 

15th-century travelers
15th-century Italian Jews
1508 deaths
15th-century births
People from Volterra
Holy Land travellers
Medieval Jewish travel writers